The Prêmio Extra de Televisão de melhor ator coadjuvante (English: Extra Television Awards for Best Supporting Actor)  is an award presented annually by the newspaper Extra.

Winners 
 2008 – Cauã Reymond in A Favorita
 Ary Fontoura in A Favorita
 Bruno Gagliasso in Ciranda de Pedra
 Iran Malfitano in A Favorita
 Jackson Antunes in A Favorita
 2009 – Bruno Gagliasso in Caminho das Índias
 Alexandre Nero in Paraíso
 Antonio Calloni in Caminho das Índias
 Elias Gleizer in Caminho das Índias
 Fábio Lago in Caras & Bocas
 Petrônio Gontijo in Poder Paralelo
 2010 – Cauã Reymond in Passione
 Rodrigo Lopez in Ti Ti Ti
 Marcello Airoldi in Viver a Vida
 Kiko Mascarenhas in Separação?!
 Daniel Boaventura in Cama de Gato
 Werner Schünemann in Passione
 2011 – André Gonçalves in André Gonçalves
 Herson Capri in Insensato Coração
 Humberto Martins in O Astro
 Marcos Caruso in Cordel Encantado
 Otaviano Costa in Morde & Assopra
 Ricardo Tozzi in Insensato Coração
 2012 – José de Abreu in Avenida Brasil
 Alexandre Borges in Avenida Brasil
 José Wilker in Gabriela
 Juliano Cazarré in Avenida Brasil
 Marcos Caruso in Avenida Brasil
 Marcos Palmeira in Cheias de Charme
 2013 – Alexandre Nero in Salve Jorge
 Anderson Di Rizzi in Amor à Vida
 Joaquim Lopes in Sangue Bom
 José Loreto in Flor do Caribe
 Luís Mello in Amor à Vida
 Nando Cunha in Salve Jorge
 2014 – Aílton Graça in Império
 José Mayer in Império
 Luís Miranda in Geração Brasil
 Marcello Melo Jr. in Em Família
 Paulo Vilhena in Império
 Rodrigo Pandolfo in Geração Brasil
 2015 – Rainer Cadete in Verdades Secretas
 Eduardo Moscovis in A Regra do Jogo
 João Miguel in Felizes para Sempre?
 Marcos Palmeira in Babilônia
 Tonico Pereira in A Regra do Jogo
 Zécarlos Machado in Os Dez Mandamentos
 2016 – Irandhir Santos in Velho Chico
 Anderson Di Rizzi in Êta Mundo Bom!
 Enrique Diaz in Justiça
 Gabriel Godoy in Haja Coração
 Marco Nanini in Êta Mundo Bom!
 Marco Ricca in Liberdade, Liberdade

References

External links 
Official website

Television awards for Best Supporting Actor
Awards established in 1998
Prêmio Extra de Televisão
1998 establishments in Brazil